Rapace is French surname:

 Noomi Rapace, née Norén (b. 1979, in Hudiksvall), a Swedish actress
 Ola Rapace, born: Pär Ola Norell (b. 1971), a Swedish actor

See also 

 Rapaces de Gap, a French ice hockey team based

French-language surnames